Pulaski State Park is a 100-acre state park near the village of Chepachet in Glocester, Rhode Island. It was founded in 1939 and contains a day use facility inside the George Washington Management Area with a beach and covered picnic areas. The Civilian Conservation Corps built a road to the park when "[i]n 1940, the state acquired a lease from the federal government for what is now the Casimir Pulaski State Park and Peck Pond in what is now the Glocester-Burrillville line. "

References

State parks of Rhode Island
Protected areas of Providence County, Rhode Island
Glocester, Rhode Island
Protected areas established in 1939
1939 establishments in Rhode Island
Lakes of Providence County, Rhode Island